Marawán is an extinct Arawakan language of Brazil.

References

Arawakan languages
Languages of Brazil
Languages extinct in the 20th century